Jamwa Ramgarh also popularly known as the Ramgarh, is a subdivision of the Jaipur district in Rajasthan, India. It is located on State Highway 55, about  East-North of Jaipur city. It was best known for Ramgarh Lake which is now dry.

Ramgarh Lake
Ramgarh Lake was an artificial lake situated near Jamwa Ramgarh in Rajasthan, India. At one time the lake was the main source of water supply to Jaipur city. The last time the lake received water was 1999 and it has been dry since 2000.

History 
Ramgarh was previously known as Manchi. It was won over by Kachhwaha Rajputs during their quest of Dhundhar. They renamed it Ramgarh and built temple of their kul devi Jamway Mata. That is why it is called Jamwa Ramgarh

Notable People 
Most populated community is meena

Education 
First government school esthablished by Seth Mangilal Ji Maharwal, and the committee members were  Seth Ramdayal Ji Maharwal, Seth Ramdhan Ji Maharwal, Master Rameshwar Ji Tiwari, Master Harsahay Ji Sharma, Seth Satnarayan Ji Maharwal, Seth Harinarayan Ji Maharwal, Patwari Shri Ganaga Sahay, Shrimati Mangi bai Sharma, Master Lakshaman Prasad Ji Lakhera.

Geography
The major rivers passing through the Jaipur district is Banganga. Although serious drought is rare, poor water management and exploitation of groundwater with extensive tube-well systems threatens agriculture in some areas.

Climate
During the monsoon there are frequent, heavy rains and thunderstorms, but flooding is not common. There are however occasional cold waves that lead to temperatures near freezing.

Media
Newspapers available in all parts of Jamwa Ramgarh include Hindi dailies such as Rajasthan Patrika, Dainik Bhaskar, Daily News, Dainik Nav Jyoty, Rastradoot, News Flash TV, Times Of India, DNA, HT, and Chaukadi News.

List of Villages
Under Jamwa Ramgarh subdistrict there total are 233 villages.  The largest are Andhi, Anoppura, Basna, Behlor, Bhan Pur Kalan, Bhawani, Bilod, Birasana, Bishanpura, Bobari, Booj, Chawandiya, Chawand ka mand, Dangarwada, Dhamsya, Dharmaliyo ki dhani kooda, Dhaula, Dhoolaraoji, Gathwari, Gopal Garh Indragarh, Jaichandpura, Jamwa, Kalla, Kallan, Kharkhada, Khawarani, Kooda, Lalwas, Langadiyawas, Mahangi, Manota, Mathasoola, Nayabas, Natata, Narpatiyawas, Nayala, Nimbi, Neemala, Newer, Papar, Palera, Phootalaw, Rahori, Raipur, Raisar, Rajpurwastala, Ramgarh, Rampura, Roopwas, Saipura, Samred, Sankotada, Tala, Thali, Tholai, Todameena, Radhagovindpura, Bad Rasulpura, Nimbi, Kelanwas.

External links

  Jaipur District Administration site
 Dr. Bhimrao Ambedkar Law University Official Website
 Dr. Bhimrao Ambedkar Law University

References

Cities and towns in Jaipur district